Micronesia competed at the 2011 Pacific Games in Nouméa, New Caledonia between August 27 and September 10, 2011. As of June 28, 2011 Micronesia has listed 24 competitors.

Athletics

Micronesia has qualified 1 athlete.

Men
John Howard

Basketball

Micronesia has qualified a men's team.  Each team can consist of a maximum of 12 athletes.

Men
Kilafwa Palik
Kelvin Simram Sam
Horrace Richard Salik
Tarrence Lee Kibby
David Taulung
Kelly Tobin
Edy Nifon
Yoshiro Alokoa
Paul Hein
Harry Elley
Shrew K. Jerry
Kezin Karry Lotte Jr

Swimming

Micronesia has qualified 2 athletes.

Men
Kerson Hadley

Women
Danisha Paul

Weightlifting

Micronesia has qualified 2 athletes.

Men
Manuel Minginfel -  -62 kg Clean & Jerk,  -62 kg Snatch,  -62 kg Total
Jesse Yuw Johnathon

References

Pac
Nations at the 2011 Pacific Games
Federated States of Micronesia at the Pacific Games